Palani Vaughan (May 27, 1944 – December 8, 2016) was a Hawaiian musician. During his career, he was a featured artist on Hawaii Calls. KCCN radio included his songs "Ipo Lei Manu", "Ka Mamakakaua", "Eia No Kawika/Kalakaua He Inoa", "He Pua Wehiwa", "Ku‘i Ka Lono", "Ia Oe E Ka La" and "He‘eia" among its list of best songs created by Hawaiian artists.  He and Peter Moon were founding members of Sunday Manoa. He was inducted into the Hawaiian Music Hall of Fame in 2008.  

Vaughan was recognized as an authority on Hawaiian culture, and formed the King's Own musical group as a tribute to King Kalākaua. He was part of the 1985 committee that created the bronze statue of Kalākaua located at the corner of Kalakaua and Kapiolani avenues in Waikiki. He died on December 8, 2016 aged 72 due to amyloidosis, a heart condition caused by abnormal amyloid protein buildup in organs.

Filmography

References

2016 deaths
Musicians from Hawaii
1944 births